Quart is an imperial and US customary unit of volume.

Quart may also refer to:

 Quart, a coin worth  of a Gibraltarian real
 Quart Festival, a music festival in Norway
 Quart, a proposed metric typographic unit

Places
 Quart, Aosta Valley, a comune in Italy
 Quart, Girona, a municipality in Spain
 Quart de les Valls, a municipality in Spain
 Quart de Poblet, a municipality in Spain

People
 Alberto Arnal (1913–1966), also known as Quart, Valencian pilotari (handball player)
 Emerico di Quart (died 1313), beatified Catholic bishop
 Josie Alice Quart (1895–1980), member of the Canadian Senate

See also
 Quartz